Tolkien's frame stories are the narrative devices that J. R. R. Tolkien chose to use throughout his Middle-earth writings, especially his legendarium, to make the works resemble a genuine mythology written and edited by many hands over a long period of time. He described in detail how his fictional characters wrote their books and transmitted them to others, and showed how later in-universe editors annotated the material.

The frame story for both Tolkien's novels published in his lifetime, The Hobbit and The Lord of the Rings, is that the eponymous Hobbit Bilbo Baggins wrote a memoir of his adventures, which became The Red Book of Westmarch. This was continued by his relative Frodo Baggins, who carried the One Ring to Mount Doom, and then by Frodo's servant, Samwise Gamgee, who had accompanied him. The Lord of the Rings contains an appendix, "The Tale of Aragorn and Arwen", which, being written by Men rather than Hobbits, has its own frame story.

The legendarium, the body of writing behind the posthumously-published The Silmarillion, has a frame story that evolved over Tolkien's long writing career. It centred on a character, Aelfwine the mariner, whose name, like those of several later reincarnations of the frame-characters, means "Elf-friend". He sails the seas and is shipwrecked on an island where the Elves narrate their tales to him. The legendarium contains two incomplete time-travel novels, The Book of Lost Tales and The Notion Club Papers, which are framed by various "Elf-friend" characters who by dream or other means visit earlier ages, all the way back to the ancient, Atlantis-like lost civilisation of Númenor.

Tolkien was influenced by William Morris's use of a frame story in his epic poem The Earthly Paradise, in which mariners of Norway set sail for the mythical place, where they hear and narrate tales, one of them of a wanderer much like Eärendil. Tolkien was familiar, too, with the Celtic Imram sea-voyage legends such as those of St Brendan, who returned to tell many stories, and published a poem called "Imram" from his legendarium.

Context

Frame stories 

A frame story is a tale that encloses or frames the main story or set of stories. For example, in Mary Shelley's 1818 novel Frankenstein, the main story is framed by a fictional correspondence between an explorer and his sister; in One Thousand and One Nights, compiled during the Islamic Golden Age, the many stories are framed by a tale that Shahrazad keeps the king from executing her by telling him a story every night, each time not completing the story by daybreak so that he spares her life for just one more day.

The Red Book of Westmarch 

In the last chapter of The Hobbit, Tolkien writes of the protagonist and titular character Bilbo Baggins returning from the journey to the Lonely Mountain and composing his memoirs, to record the events described in the book. Bilbo thinks of calling his work There and Back Again, A Hobbit's Holiday.  Tolkien's full name for the novel is indeed The Hobbit or There and Back Again. In the first chapter of The Lord of the Rings, Bilbo's There and Back Again tale is said to be written in his red leather-bound diary.
While living in Rivendell, Bilbo expands his memoirs into a record of the events of The Lord of the Rings, including the exploits of his kinsman Frodo Baggins and others. He leaves the material for Frodo to complete and organize. Frodo writes down the bulk of the final work, using Bilbo's diary and "many pages of loose notes". At the close of Tolkien's main narrative, the work is almost complete, and Frodo leaves the task to his gardener and close friend and heir Samwise Gamgee.

The Tolkien scholar Verlyn Flieger writes that Tolkien, seeking to present his Middle-earth writings as a credible mythology, needed to create a "credible book tradition". He went to "elaborate lengths" to achieve this, including many mentions of Bilbo's "diary" and "Translations from the Elvish", supposedly created during his years of retirement, complete with "the masses of notes and paper in his room at Rivendell". She observes that the simulated tradition is already in evidence, hidden in plain sight, in The Hobbit, whose dust jacket is "surreptitiously" ornamented by Tolkien with ancient-looking runes, which read:

Flieger notes that The Hobbits frame story is rather fragile, since the book's narrator often speaks in a voice that cannot be Bilbo's. In The Lord of the Rings, on the other hand, Tolkien carefully embedded the frame story in the text, from the earliest drafts. He has Bilbo talk in the Council of Elrond about getting on with his book, saying that he was "just writing an ending for it", but realising that it now needed "several more chapters" because of Frodo's adventures on the way to Rivendell. She comments that Tolkien "went so far as to draw up a title page" for his Red Book, showing Bilbo's "largely unsatisfactory tries" at finding an appropriate title. The final title is Frodo's:

Flieger writes that at the time of the release of the first edition of The Lord of the Rings in 1954, Tolkien had not yet included that text in the Red Book; its prologue spoke of The Hobbit as containing "a selection from the Red Book of Westmarch". Tolkien went on developing the frame story, and in the second edition he added a "Note on the Shire Records" to the prologue. It explains, in the voice of the fictional editor, that the "account" (the main text of The Lord of the Rings) was taken mainly from the Red Book of Westmarch, stating that this was begun as "Bilbo's private diary", continued by Frodo with an account of the War of the Ring, and extended by Sam.

Near the end of the main text, Tolkien has Frodo give the Red Book to Sam. Flieger notes that, seeing it, Sam says "Why, you have nearly finished it, Mr. Frodo!", and describes Frodo's answer as "both definitive and revealing": "'I have quite finished, Sam', said Frodo. 'The last pages are for you'." She comments that where Sam says "it", meaning the book, Frodo does not, leaving open whether he means the book or his life in Middle-earth as he has recorded in the book. She briefly considers what Sam might have been supposed to have added, if the suggestion is to be taken at all seriously. She points out that they could have been books 4 and 6 of The Lord of the Rings, where Frodo is never seen without Sam, but there are times when Sam is alert while Frodo is absent or unconscious. Further, no other observer was present, especially at Mount Doom where Sam is the only person who sees Gollum fighting an invisible Frodo for the Ring.

Flieger observes that on the stairs of the dangerous pass of Cirith Ungol, Frodo and Sam talk about what a story is. Sam says "We're in one, of course, but I mean put into words, you know ... read out of a great big book with red and black letters". Frodo answers "Why Sam ... to hear you somehow makes me as merry as if the story were already written". Flieger writes that this is "the most self-referential and post-modern moment in the entire book", since it constitutes the book itself looking both back at its own creation, and forward to the printed book that the reader is holding. She compares this with a passage that Tolkien certainly knew, lines 867–874 of Beowulf, where the scop who is reciting the poem sings of a poet singing about Beowulf. In her view, Sam's "put into words, you know" is a deliberate echo of Beowulfs "glorying in words".

Peter Jackson chose to continue the use of the frame story of Bilbo's memoirs in his film adaptations. In his 2001 The Fellowship of the Ring, Bilbo's There and Back Again provided the basis for the voiceover for the scene "Concerning Hobbits"; this was greatly extended in the Special Extended Edition. The memoirs' title became the working title for the third of Jackson's The Hobbit Films in August 2012, but in 2014 he changed it to The Hobbit: The Battle of the Five Armies.

"The Tale of Aragorn and Arwen" 

The Lord of the Rings contains a second frame story, for the appendix "The Tale of Aragorn and Arwen". The tale describes how the hero Aragorn came to marry an immortal Elf-woman, Arwen. Tolkien stated that it was "really essential" to the work. Its frame story is that the tale was written by Faramir and Éowyn's grandson Barahir after Aragorn's death, and that an abbreviated version of the tale was included in a copy of the Thain's Book made by Findegil. This in turn was annotated, corrected, and extended in Minas Tirith. The Tolkien scholar Giuseppe Pezzini writes that the "meta-textual frame ... is duly harmonised in the text through the use of formal features; the appendixes are indeed full of scribal glosses, later notes, and editorial references that are meant to match the elaborate textual history detailed in the Note on the Shire Records." The narrative voice and the story's point of view are examined by the scholar Christine Barkley, who considers the main part of the tale to have been narrated by Aragorn.

Tolkien's legendarium 

Tolkien thought of his legendarium, the large body of documents of many kinds that lies behind the text of the text published in 1977 as The Silmarillion, as a presented collection, with a frame story that changed over the years, first with an Ælfwine-type character who translates the "Golden Book" of the sages Rumil or Pengoloð; later, having the Hobbit Bilbo Baggins collect the stories into the Red Book of Westmarch, translating mythological Elvish documents in Rivendell.

Ælfwine 

In The Book of Lost Tales, begun early in Tolkien's writing career, the character who becomes Ælfwine the mariner is named Ottor Wǽfre (called Eriol by the Elves), and his tale serves as frame story for the tales of the Elves. He sets out from what is today Heligoland on a voyage with a small crew, but is the lone survivor after his ship crashes upon the rocks near an island. The island is inhabited by an old man who gives him directions to Eressëa. After he finds the island, the Elves host him in the Cottage of Lost Play and narrate their tales to him. He afterwards learns from them that the old man he met was actually "Ylmir". He is taught most of the tales by the old Elf Rúmil, Eressëa's lore master.

In these early versions, Tol Eressea is seen as the island of Britain. He earned the name Ælfwine from the Elves; his first wife, Cwén, was the mother of Hengest and Horsa; his second wife, Naimi, bore him a third son, Heorrenda, a great poet of half-Elven descent, who in the fiction would go on to write the Old English epic poem Beowulf. This weaves together a mythology for England, connecting England's geography, poetry and mythology with the Legendarium as a plausibly reconstructed (though probably untrue) prehistory.

The Book of Lost Tales 

The first title for The Book of Lost Tales framed the stories as a transmitted collection:

In the fiction, a series of named Elves told the "lost tales" to Eriol/Ælfwine. He transmitted them via Heorrenda's written book. As edited by Christopher Tolkien, the 1983 Book of Lost Tales, Volume 1 is inscribed:

The Notion Club Papers 

In the novel's frame story, a Mr. Green finds documents in sacks of waste paper at Oxford in 2012. These documents, the Notion Club Papers of the title, are the incomplete notes of meetings of the Notion Club; these meetings are said to have occurred in the 1980s. During these meetings, Alwin Arundel Lowdham discusses his lucid dreams about Númenor, a lost civilisation connected with Atlantis and with Tolkien's Middle-earth. Through these dreams, he "discovers" much about the Númenor story and the languages of Middle-earth (notably Quenya, Sindarin, and Adûnaic). While not finished, at the end of the given story it becomes clear Lowdham himself is a reincarnation of sorts of Elendil. Tolkien selected the names of these characters to indicate their affinity: Alwin is another form of the Old English name "Aelfwine", meaning "Elf-friend", while the Quenya name Elendil can carry the same meaning.

Analysis 

Anna Vaninskaya, in Blackwell's 2014 A Companion to J. R. R. Tolkien, notes that Tolkien was directly influenced by William Morris. She suggests that the legendarium's frame story, starting from the travels of Ælfwine the mariner, was modelled on Morris's 1868–1870 epic poem The Earthly Paradise, whose frame story is that "mariners of Norway, having ... heard of the Earthly Paradise, set sail to find it". She notes that Morris's "wanderers" reach "A nameless city in a distant sea / White as the changing walls of faërie", where they hear and narrate legends including "The Land East of the Sun and West of the Moon"; Tolkien's Lost Tales II contains one of the legendarium's foundation-poems that similarly describes the "Wanderer" Earendel (forerunner of Tolkien's Eärendil), who sails "West of the Moon, east of the Sun".

Tolkien's biographer John Garth, in the same volume, writes that in 1920, Tolkien revised his frame story so that the Lonely Isle was no longer equated with England, and Eriol became the Anglo-Saxon Ælfwine; this began the process of revising the legendarium that continued throughout his life. He notes that in 1945 and 1946, Tolkien added The Notion Club Papers, visiting ancient Númenor by travelling in time rather than by ship, but with a poem about St Brendan's Imram sea-voyages that he revised as the 1955 "Imram".

The Tolkien scholar Jane Chance describes the 1920 version of the Ælfwine story as "Tolkien's complicated penultimate version of the pseudo-historical and Anglo-Saxon frame-story", calling it important to any understanding of "Middle-earth's kernel mythology".

Dale Nelson, in The J. R. R. Tolkien Encyclopedia, writes that Tolkien and his friend C. S. Lewis admired David Lindsay's A Voyage to Arcturus, but that Tolkien "regretted" the science fiction style frame story machinery that Lindsay had used – the back-rays and the crystal torpedo ship; he notes that in The Notion Club Papers, Tolkien makes one of the protagonists, Guildford, criticise those kinds of "contraptions".

Notes

References

Primary 

This list identifies each item's location in Tolkien's writings.

Secondary

Sources 

 
 
 
 
    
 
 
 
 
 

Middle-earth
Frame stories
Themes of The Lord of the Rings